Mount Vernon–Enola School District 19 (MVESD)  is a public school district based in Mount Vernon, Arkansas. MVESD supports more than 500 students in kindergarten through grade 12 and employs more than 90 faculty and staff on a full time equivalent basis for its two schools.

The school district encompasses  of land, in Faulkner County and White County, and serves all of Mount Vernon and Enola as well as a small section of Holland.

History 
It was formed by the July 1, 1991 consolidation of the Enola School District and the Mount Vernon School District.

Schools 
The Mount Vernon/Enola School District and all of its schools are accredited by the Arkansas Department of Education (ADE) and AdvancED (formerly North Central Association).

Interscholastic athletic activities for the high school is administered by the Arkansas Activities Association. Mt Vernon-Enola is affiliated with the Conway Area Career Center to support the students' career and technical education needs.

Schools:
 Mount Vernon–Enola High School, located in Mount Vernon and serving grades 7 through 12.
 Mount Vernon–Enola Elementary School, located in Enola and serving prekindergarten through grade 6.

References

Further reading
Map of predecessor districts:
  (Download)
  (Download)

External links
 

Education in Faulkner County, Arkansas
Education in White County, Arkansas
School districts in Arkansas
School districts established in 1991
1991 establishments in Arkansas